The Satellite S series was Toshiba Information Systems's midrange line of Satellite laptops. It was introduced in 2012, positioned above their mainstream L series but below the premium P range. Features included Nvidia GeForce graphics processing units, Harman Kardon speakers, optional touchscreen displays and optional backlit keyboards; it was the lowest price entry of the Satellite family to offer discrete graphics. Displays ranged from 14 to 17.3 inches diagonally in size, with only displays 15.6 inches diagonally or larger affording the option for full 1080p resolution initially—14-in panels were limited to 1366×768. The series was refreshed in 2015 to add a 4K panel option and raised the minimum screen size to 15.6 inches diagonally. The first models of the S series included an optical drive bay, with an option for a Blu-ray drive. The bay was removed in a 2014 refresh to make the laptop slimmer but restored in the 2015 refresh.

On its introduction, technology journalists wrote that the S series almost reached ultrabook status in terms of performance and features but fell short due to heft.

Toshiba discontinued the S series in 2016 along with the entire Satellite line of laptops.

Models

References

Satellite S series